The 1978 South American Artistic Gymnastics Championships were held in Lima, Peru, November 22–26, 1978. This was the fourth edition of the South American Artistic Gymnastics Championships.

Participating nations

Medalists

References

1978 in gymnastics
South American Gymnastics Championships
International gymnastics competitions hosted by Peru
1978 in Peruvian sport
November 1978 sports events in South America